Hinako Tomitaka (born 21 September 2000) is a Japanese freestyle skier who competes internationally.

She competed in the FIS Freestyle Ski and Snowboarding World Championships 2021, where she placed fifth in women's ski moguls.

References

2000 births
Living people
Japanese female freestyle skiers
Freestyle skiers at the 2022 Winter Olympics
Olympic freestyle skiers of Japan
Freestyle skiers at the 2017 Asian Winter Games